The National Chimney Sweep Guild (NCSG) is a non-profit trade association for chimney sweeps and chimney and venting manufacturers in the United States and Canada. Based in Plainfield, Indiana, it has approximately 1,100 member companies. Member companies range in size from the owner-operator sole proprietor chimney sweep companies to those with 15+ vehicle crews and manufacturers with hundreds of employees.

NCSG was founded in 1977 as a result of increased woodstove use due to the oil embargo crisis of the early to mid-1970s. It is the only national trade association representing chimney professionals in North America. 

The stated mission of the NCSG is "to promote the success of its members by providing progressive services, encouraging professionalism and ethical accountability and advancing the chimney and venting industry through public awareness of the trade." Membership is open to any chimney-related company, be it manufacturer, supplier, distributor or service company. The NCSG is governed by an elected board of directors made up of representatives from eight geographic regions within North America, one supplier representative and four at-large directors. 

In 1986, NCSG published the first edition of Successful Chimney Sweeping, the first manual to set a standard for chimney service practices ever written.

The NCSG supports regional and state chimney sweep guilds and associations and is a member of the European Federation of Chimney Sweeps (ESCHFOE) and regularly participates in international technical and business meetings. Eleven times each year, the National Chimney Sweep Guild publishes its trade journal,  Sweeping: The Journal of Chimney and Venting Technology.

External links
Official website

1977 establishments in Indiana
Organizations established in 1977
Trade associations based in the United States
Chimney sweeps
Non-profit organizations based in Indiana